Raimo Honkanen (10 August 1938 – 17 June 2020) was a Finnish cyclist. He was born in Turku and his profession was a postal worker. He competed at the 1960 Summer Olympics and the 1968 Summer Olympics.

References

External links
 

1938 births
2020 deaths
Finnish male cyclists
Olympic cyclists of Finland
Cyclists at the 1960 Summer Olympics
Cyclists at the 1968 Summer Olympics
Sportspeople from Turku